Rebekah Staton (born 17 June 1981 in Leek, Staffordshire, England) is an English actress and narrator. She is best known for narrating Don't Tell The Bride and for her roles as Della in Raised by Wolves and Katy in Home. She has also appeared in numerous other British TV programmes like DanTDM Creates a Big Scene as a voice actress.

Early life

Born in Leek, Staffordshire, her family then moved to Shrewsbury, and aged nine to Penkridge, Staffordshire. She attended Wolgarston High School, and then trained at the Royal Academy of Dramatic Art (RADA).

Career
Her TV credits include playing Jenny in the 2007 Doctor Who two-part "Human Nature"/"The Family of Blood", and Althea in two episodes in the series Rome. She played Louise in the BBC Three award-winning sitcom Pulling. She also plays Kristina in the BBC One version of the Wallander series.

Other appearances include two episodes of The Amazing Mrs Pritchard, six of State of Play, and the film Bright Young Things. She had a small part in the 2006 mini series Jane Eyre. She plays the character of the superhero "She-Force" in the 2008 ITV2 series No Heroics and played the character of Kelly in the BBC comedy Home Time.

In 2011, she acted as Caitlin in the Sky1 comedy series Spy.

In 2011, she appeared in "The Entire History of You", an episode of the anthology series Black Mirror.

From 2013 until 2016 Staton played Della in the Channel 4 sitcom Raised by Wolves, a performance described as "utterly brilliant".

In 2016 Staton was cast in the second series of Ordinary Lies as Wendy Walker. Filming started in March 2016.

Stage work includes Paula/Shirley Honeywell/Sue Braithwaite in Playing with Fire by David Edgar at the National Theatre's Olivier auditorium (September–October 2005).

Staton was the narrator for the BBC Three and BBC America documentary 18 Pregnant Schoolgirls, as well as being the narrator for the E4 reality television series Don't Tell the Bride. She also voices Bethany in Dragon Age II and provided the voiceover for the Channel 5 documentary series Candy Bar Girls.

Staton played Katy in Home from 2019 to 2020.

Filmography

TV
 Home (2019–2020) as Katy
 DanTDM Creates a Big Scene (2017) as Ellie
 Ordinary Lies (2016) as Wendy Walker
 Up the Women (2014) as Betty
 Remember Me (2014) as Alison Denning
 Raised by Wolves (2013–2016) as Della Garry
 Love Matters (2013) as Jenny
 Great Night Out (2013) as Kath
 Moving On (2013) as Lisa
 Hunderby (2012) as Annie
 Inside Men (2012) as Sandra
 Groove High (2012) as Vic
 Wallander (Episodes "Before the Frost", "The Dogs of Riga", "An Event in Autumn") 
 Black Mirror: "The Entire History of You" (2011) as Colleen
 Spy (2011) as Caitlin Banks
 No Heroics as Jenny/"She-Force"
 Pulling (2006–2009) as Louise
 Rome (2007) as Althea (Episodes "These Being the Words of Marcus Tullius Cicero" and "Testudo et Lepus")
 Doctor Who (2007) as Jenny (Episodes Human Nature / The Family of Blood)
 Jane Eyre (2006) as Bessie
 Outlaws (2004) as Janey
 State of Play (2003) Liz

Movies
 Will (2011)
 The Hustle (2019) as Chloe, a pub girl

References

External links
 

1981 births
Living people
People from Leek, Staffordshire
People from Penkridge
Alumni of RADA
English television actresses
21st-century English actresses
English stage actresses
Actors from Staffordshire